Torca Island was an inhabited phantom island said to be located in the Indian Ocean, possibly in the East Indies. It purportedly vanished when a volcano erupted on June 4, 1693. The survivors escaped to a nearby island called Amboyna (present-day Ambon Island) on 18 July 1693. The villagers attempted to flee in canoes or by swimming, but many people died attempting to do this.

References 

 Vincent Gaddis (1965). Invisible Horizons, p. 29.  New York: Chilton Books.
 Clark Barnaby Firestone (1924). The Coasts of Illusion: A Study of Travel Tales, p. 255.  Harper Books.
 William Shepard Walsh (1913).  A Handy Book of Curious Information, pp. 910–911.  J. B. Lippincott.

Phantom islands
Islands of the Indian Ocean